The 2005 American Handball Women's Youth Championships took place in Brusque from September 6 – 10. It acts as the Pan American qualifying tournament for the 2006 World Youth Women's Handball Championship.

Teams

Preliminary round

Group A

Group B

Placement 5th–8th

7th/8th

5th/6th

Final round

Semifinals

Bronze medal match

Gold medal match

Final standing

References 
 brasilhandebol.com.br

2005 in handball
Pan American Women's Youth Handball Championship
2005 in youth sport